Metabolic flexibility is the capacity to alter metabolism in response to exercise or available fuel (especially fats and carbohydrates). Metabolic inflexibility was first described as the ability to generate energy through either aerobic or anaerobic respiration or as the inability of muscle to increase glucose oxidation in response to insulin.  An organism can also be said to have metabolic flexibility if it is capable of metabolizing either carbohydrate or fat efficiency, depending on availability of those fuels.

With aging there is a decrease in metabolic flexibility due to a decline in pyruvate dehydrogenase activity which results in pyruvate increasingly being anaerobically converted to lactate rather than aerobically converted to acetyl-CoA. Similarly, a virus-induced cytokine storm can compromise metabolic flexibility by inactivating the pyruvate dehydrogenase complex and other enzymes.

See also
 Insulin resistance

References 

Biochemistry
Medical terminology